İlayda Akdoğan (born 21 July 1998) is a Turkish actress and YouTuber.

Life and career
İlayda Akdoğan was born on 21 July 1998 in Istanbul. She started her career at the age of six in 2004 when she appeared in a children show titled En İyi Arkadaşım and portrayed the character of Seda. In 2005, she appeared in the series Afacanlar Kampı. In 2007, she was cast in the series Bez Bebek and portrayed the character of Gülay. In the same year she made an appearance in the series Sevgili Dünürüm. In 2015, she made her cinematic debut with the movie Mustang and depicted the character of Sonay. In 2016, she made appearances in two series. Firstly, she appeared in Oyunbozan and depicted the character of Eylül. Secondly, she had a main role in FOX TV Series Umuda Kelepçe Vurulmaz and depicted the character of Elif. In 2017, she made her debut in the summer series Dolunay and depicted the character of Asuman, a mischievous and rebellious girl. The show starred Can Yaman and Özge Gürel as the leading characters.

She has also a YouTube channel, by the name İlayda Akdoğan. She has 180K subscribers as of August 2021.

Personal life
Akdoğan is dating Iranian basketball player Roham Kabir. In 2020, she travelled to Tehran, Iran to meet him, but got stranded there due to the cancellation of flights during the COVID-19 pandemic. However, she returned to Istanbul four months later on 29 June 2020.

Filmography

References

External links
 
 
 İlayda Akdoğan on YouTube

Living people
1998 births
Actresses from Istanbul
Turkish television actresses
Turkish YouTubers
21st-century Turkish actresses
Turkish film actresses
IFFI Best Actor (Female) winners